Mercedes-Benz India Pvt Ltd is a wholly owned subsidiary of the German Mercedes-Benz Group founded in 1994, with headquarters in Pune, Maharashtra, India.

History
Daimler entered the Indian market and established Mercedes-Benz India Ltd in 1994. The company was renamed DaimlerChrysler India Pvt. Ltd. after the merger of the parent company Daimler with Chrysler. Mercedes-Benz India is a wholly owned subsidiary of the Daimler AG. Mercedes-Benz India pioneered the luxury car market in India. The company is headquartered in Chakan, Pune, Maharashtra. In 2022, Daimler split into two separate entities, one focusing on passenger vehicles under the newly formed Mercedes-Benz Group moniker and the other on commercial vehicles as Daimler Trucks.

Manufacturing Facilities
Mercedes-Benz started assembly and manufacturing in India in 1994.

Spread over 100 acres in the city of Chakan, Maharashtra, this plant was set up in 2009.

The company locally assembles 14 cars including series cars A-Class Limousine, New C-Class, E-Class Long Wheelbase, S-Class,  Mercedes Maybach S 580 limousine and luxury SUVs such as GLA, GLC, GLC Coupé, GLE and GLS. In 2020, Mercedes-Benz pioneered local manufacturing of high-performance AMG vehicles and produces three AMG models: the AMG GLC 43 4MATIC Coupe, the AMG A 35 4MATIC+ saloon, AMG GLA 35 4MATIC+ SUV.  Mercedes-Benz India's Completely Built imported (CBU) portfolio includes the GLB, EQB, EQC, GLS Maybach, MG G 63 SUVs. and AMG E 53 Cabriolet.

In 2022, India became the first market for Mercedes-Benz outside of Germany to locally manufacture the  flagship luxury EV- the EQS 580.

Retail of the Future 
Mercedes-Benz India launched Retail of the Future in 2021. This is a direct to customer sales model. Under this model, Mercedes Benz sells cars directly to buyers, ensuring transparent pricing and best deal, and has taken charge of all the inventory, reducing the interest burden on dealers and taking away incidental or handling charges from the system.

Electrification 
Mercedes-Benz India introduced the first luxury EV, EQC in 2020. In 2022, the company launched EQS 580, the first 'Made in India' luxury electric car. India became the first market for Mercedes-Benz outside of Germany to locally manufacture the  flagship luxury EV. With an ARAI-certified range of 857 km, the EQS 580 4Matic has the highest range of any EV currently on sale in India. Mercedes-Benz launched its fourth electric vehicle for India, the EQB with a 7-seat layout.

As of 2022, Mercedes-Benz India has set up 35 Ultra-Fast Chargers across the country.  Its EV customers can avail themselves of complimentary charging for the first year of car ownership.

Mercedes-Benz has planned to install more than 100 units of 22 kW AC chargers, over 20 units of 60 kW DC fast chargers, and more than 20 units of 180 kW rapid EV charging points.

MercedesTrophy 
The Mercedes Trophy is an international three-tier structured amateur golf series where amateur golfers compete to qualify for the Mercedes Trophy World Final in Stuttgart (Germany). In India, 21 editions have taken place so far with over 20,000 amateur golfers taking part from across the country and two winning the 2022 World Finals.

Mercedes-Benz Research and Development India
Mercedes-Benz Research and Development India (MBRDI) is the largest research and development centre for Mercedes-Benz Group AG outside of Germany. Established in 1996 in Bengaluru and Pune, MBRDI plays a prominent role in the development of new technologies like connected, autonomous, and electric in the mobility world. The company currently employs over 6,000 professionals in the field of engineering, digitalisation, testing and simulation, and data science.

Sales and Service Network

Mercedes- Benz India also has the largest network spread amongst any luxury carmaker, with presence in 47 Indian cities with over 120 touchpoints.

Pre-Owned Cars
Mercedes-Benz launched its new used car brand, Mercedes-Benz Certified in India in December 2014 by the simultaneous inauguration of 12 new Mercedes-Benz Certified outlets across India.

In 2021, Mercedes-Benz India launched a new used car online platform called Mercedes-Benz Marketplace. The new marketplace works on the principle of 'direct customer to customer' selling. Customers looking to sell or buy a pre-owned Mercedes-Benz car can visit the platform to avail services provided by the company.

Sales Performance
Mercedes-Benz India recorded its highest ever sales in a calendar year in 2022. Retaining the No.1 spot for the eighth consecutive year since 2015, the company delivered 15,822 new cars to customers, marking a year-on-year growth of 41%.

Models

Models
Mercedes-Benz A-Class
Mercedes-Benz C-Class
Mercedes-Benz E-Class 
Mercedes-Benz GLA-Class
Mercedes-Benz GLB
Mercedes-Benz GLC-Class
Mercedes-Benz GLE-Class
Mercedes-Benz GLS-Class
Mercedes-Benz S-Class
Mercedes-Benz V-Class
Mercedes-Benz EQS
Mercedes-Benz EQB
Mercedes-Benz EQC
Mercedes-Maybach
Mercedes-AMG
 List of Mercedes-Benz vehicles

Competition 
Porsche India
Audi India
BMW India
Lexus India

References

External links

 
Vehicle manufacturing companies established in 1994
Car manufacturers of India
Indian subsidiaries of foreign companies
Manufacturing companies based in Pune
1994 establishments in Maharashtra
Indian companies established in 1994